The Canadian Mixed Doubles Curling Championship (formerly Canadian Mixed Doubles Curling Trials) are the national curling championships for mixed doubles curling in Canada. The trials decide the team that represents Canada at the same year's World Mixed Doubles Curling Championship. The team representing Canada had been previously decided through a playoff between two teams formed from the winners of the Canadian Mixed Curling Championship earlier in the season.

Format and qualification
As of 2017, the event consists of thirty-two teams participating in a preliminary round robin and a single-knockout playoff. Each of the provincial and territorial curling associations are allotted one entry into the championship, as well as the final four teams from the previous championship, one bonspiel winner with the remaining teams qualifying based on their ranking on the Canadian Mixed Doubles Ranking (CMDR).

Past champions

References

 
Recurring sporting events established in 2013
2013 establishments in Canada